The Bridgeport Main Post Office is located at 120 Middle Street in Bridgeport, Connecticut.  It is a three-story Moderne/Art Deco, designed by Louis A. Simon, the supervising architect of the United States Treasury Department, and completed in 1934.  The building notably includes artwork funded by the department's Section of Painting and Sculpture, with murals in its lobby area drawn by R. L. Lambden depicting mail delivery through the ages.

The building was listed on the National Register of Historic Places in 1986.

See also 

National Register of Historic Places listings in Bridgeport, Connecticut
List of United States post offices

References

External links

 
  

Art Deco architecture in Connecticut
Bridgeport
Government buildings completed in 1934
Moderne architecture in Connecticut
Buildings and structures in Bridgeport, Connecticut
National Register of Historic Places in Fairfield County, Connecticut
Historic district contributing properties in Connecticut
1934 establishments in Connecticut